The EMD DD35 was a  diesel-electric locomotive of D-D wheel arrangement built by General Motors Electro-Motive Division for the Union Pacific Railroad and Southern Pacific Railroad.

History
In the early 1960s, Union Pacific started asking for a  3-unit locomotive set to not only replace their turbine locomotives, but to bring a new generation of diesel locomotives to their rails, and then put them into use. The EMD (Electro Motive Division of General Motors) DD35 was a cabless booster (B unit) locomotive that consisted of two GP35 locomotives prime movers (engines) and electrical systems, mounted on a common frame and covered with a single cowling, riding on a pair of 4-axle Flexicoil trucks, so each prime mover was powering a single set of 4 axles instead of two sets of 2 axles, as in the GP35. Being a "B-unit", the DD35 lacked any sort of cab, and could only be run on the main line when connected with another "A-unit" to control it; the DDA35 is an "A-unit" version of this locomotive built in 1965. The 4-axle truck was considered too harsh on the trackwork to be in the lead, and thus EMD's response to UP's request was a 4-unit (instead of the requested 3-unit set) locomotive set, consisting of a pair of 2,500 hp GP35s sandwiching a pair of DD35s, to make one 15,000 hp locomotive set (basically six GP35's in four units)

EMD produced a demonstrator set like this in September 1963, painted in red and white (similar to the Frisco's livery). It was demonstrated on several railroads, but the only interest came from Union Pacific and Southern Pacific. UP bought the entire 4-unit demonstrator set, and followed with an order for 25 more, which were delivered from May through September 1964. The two demonstrator locomotives were numbered 72B and 73B; the 25 production locomotives were assigned 74B through 98B.

Southern Pacific ordered a small, three-unit sample, which were shipped with old-style bearings from six F3B trade-in units, but ordered no more. They were numbered 8400-8402, later 9500-9502, and still later 9900-9902. They were used on the SP's Sunset Route early in their lives, but were among the first locomotives sidelined whenever there was a downturn in traffic. Later, they were relegated to transfer service between West Colton and yards closer to Los Angeles, mainly Taylor Yard north of downtown. SP scrapped all three units in 1978 after their leases ran out.

The DD35s were initially quite unreliable; some of this was blamed on sand from the internal sandboxes getting in electrical gear, so new sandboxes were fitted on the walkways in 1969. They were among the last EMD road units to be built with DC generators and old-fashioned switchgear, which were more maintenance-intensive than the later AC/DC equipment.

Once teething troubles had been surmounted, the DD35s were reasonably successful, but they were less flexible than smaller units and thus all of the original B units were withdrawn by 1977 as the railroads fell on harder times. The DDA35s survived until 1981. All were eventually scrapped.

Original Buyers

See also
 EMD DD35A
 EMD DDA40X
 EMD DDM45
 ALCO Century 855
 GE U50C

References 

 
 
 

Diesel-electric locomotives of the United States
DD35
D-D locomotives
Union Pacific Railroad locomotives
Southern Pacific Railroad locomotives
Railway locomotives introduced in 1963
Locomotives with cabless variants
Scrapped locomotives
Freight locomotives
Standard gauge locomotives of the United States